This is a list of notable people who were either born in San Juan, Puerto Rico or who were not born in San Juan, but who are or were longtime residents of the city. San Juan has been the birthplace and the place of residence of many Puerto Ricans and people who are not of Puerto Rican heritage who became notable artists, military personnel, politicians, scientists and sportsmen; locally referred to as "Sanjuaneros". The following lists some of them and details their occupation:

List by profession

Due to space limitations it is almost impossible to list all of the people of San Juan who have distinguished themselves; therefore a category has been created to this effect:

References

San Juan
people